Janíky is a village and municipality in the Dunajská Streda District in the Trnava Region of south-west Slovakia.

Geography
The municipality lies at an altitude of 125 metres and covers an area of 11.343 km2.

History
In the 9th century, the territory of Janiky became part of the Kingdom of Hungary. In historical records the name of the village was first mentioned in 1287 in the Hungarian form Janok. The Slovak form was first recorded in 1311 as Janyk. In 1940, three villages Alsójányok, Felsőjányok and Bústelek were unified creating the present-day municipality.

Until the end of World War I, it was part of Hungary and fell within the Somorja district of Pozsony County. After the Austro-Hungarian army disintegrated in November 1918, Czechoslovak troops occupied the area. After the Treaty of Trianon of 1920, the village became officially part of Czechoslovakia. In November 1938, the First Vienna Award granted the area to Hungary and it was held by Hungary until 1945. After Soviet occupation in 1945, Czechoslovak administration returned and the village became officially part of Czechoslovakia in 1947.

Demography 
At the 2001 Census the recorded population of the village was 782 while an end-2008 estimate by the Statistical Office had the village's population as 834. As of 2001, 90.28% of its population were Hungarians, while 9.08% were Slovaks.

Roman Catholicism is the majority religion of the village, its adherents numbering 96.80% of the total population.

See also
 List of municipalities and towns in Slovakia

References

Genealogical resources

The records for genealogical research are available at the state archive "Statny Archiv in Bratislava, Slovakia"
 Roman Catholic church records (births/marriages/deaths): 1673-1897 (parish B)
 Lutheran church records (births/marriages/deaths): 1706-1895 (parish B)

External links
The Janiky/Jányok castles 
Surnames of living people in Janiky

Villages and municipalities in Dunajská Streda District
Hungarian communities in Slovakia